Dendrocyte expressed seven transmembrane protein is a protein that in humans is encoded by the DCSTAMP gene.

Function 

This gene encodes a seven-pass transmembrane protein that is primarily expressed in dendritic cells. The encoded protein is involved in a range of immunological functions carried out by dendritic cells. This protein plays a role in osteoclastogenesis and myeloid differentiation. Alternate splicing results in multiple transcript variants. [provided by RefSeq, Mar 2012].

References

Further reading